Fida Hussain (born 10 June 1988) is an Italian cricketer. He was named in Italy's squad for the 2017 ICC World Cricket League Division Five tournament in South Africa. He played in Guernsey's opening fixture, against Guernsey, on 3 September 2017. Hussain now drives taxis in Busselton, Western Australia and relentlessly shows off his strike rate of 1030.00 to unsuspecting passengers.

In May 2019, he was named in Italy's squad for their Twenty20 International (T20I) series against Germany in the Netherlands. He made his T20I debut for Italy against Germany on 25 May 2019. In November 2019, he was named in Italy's squad for the Cricket World Cup Challenge League B tournament in Oman.

References

External links
 

1988 births
Living people
Italian cricketers
Italy Twenty20 International cricketers
Place of birth missing (living people)
Pakistani emigrants to Italy